Trimerellida is an extinct order of craniate brachiopods, containing the superfamily Trimerelloidea and the families Adensuidae, Trimerellidae, and Ussuniidae. Trimerellidae is a small but widespread family of warm-water brachiopods ranging from the mid Ordovician (Llandeilo) to late Silurian (Ludlow). Adensuidae and Ussuniidae are monogeneric families restricted to the mid to late Ordovician (Llandeilo to lower Ashgill) of Kazakhstan.

Trimerellides were massive by the standards of early brachiopods. They had fairly smooth and unornamented shells which were probably aragonitic in composition. The shells were unequally biconvex (both valves convex to different degrees), in some cases nearly spherical in shape. There is no opening for the pedicle; individuals were free-living or clustered into congregations similar to modern oyster reefs. 

Trimerellides have some similarities to rhynchonelliform (articulate) brachiopods, including mixoperipheral shell growth (where the rear of each valve converges towards each other) and the development a fixed hinge between a wide plate on the dorsal valve and a socket-like groove on the ventral valve. Like other craniate brachiopods, the musculature consisted of two pairs of large and vertically-oriented adductor muscles (which close the shell) alongside two pairs of horizontally-oriented oblique muscles (which slide each valve past each other). The inner (internal) pair of oblique muscles extend nearly straight back to the dorsal valve hinge plate, in contrast to craniids and craniopsids, where the oblique internals splay out and attach besides the posterior adductors. A shelf is usually present near the middle of each valve, in front of the anterior adductors

References

Bibliography

 Modzalevskaya, Tatyana Lvovna (2003). "Silurian and Devonian brachiopods from Severnaya Zemlya" (Russian Arctic). Geodiversitas 25 (1). pp. 73–107.

Prehistoric brachiopods
Prehistoric animal orders
Brachiopod orders
Craniata